A number of ships of the French Navy have borne the name Souverain ("Sovereign"). Among them:

 , a 74-gun ship of the line, lead ship of her class. She was renamed Peuple souverain during the French Revolution.
 , a 120-gun 

French Navy ship names